Tristana is a 1970 drama film co-written, directed and produced by Luis Buñuel, and starring Catherine Deneuve, Fernando Rey, and Franco Nero. The screenplay by Buñuel and Julio Alejandro adapts an 1892 realist novel of the same name by Benito Pérez Galdós. It is a Spanish-French-Italian co-production filmed in Toledo, Buñuel's one-time home, and represents his return to his native country after several years living and working abroad. It earned positive acclaim from critics, and was nominated for Best Foreign-Language Film at the 43rd Academy Awards.

Plot
The story is set in the late 1920s to early 1930s in the city of Toledo. Tristana is a young woman who, following the death of her mother, becomes a ward of notorious nobleman don Lope Garrido. Despite his advancing age, Don Lope refuses to change his playboy lifestyle, while maintaining strong yet increasingly-antiquated attitudes about honor, chivalry, and women. Claiming to defend the weak from corrupt institutions (while expressing support for leftist politics), Don Lope nonetheless preys on his new ward, entranced by her beauty and innocence. He thus treats her as wife as well as daughter from the age of 19, unbeknownst to the outside world.

While Tristana initially accepts the arrangement, by age 21 she starts finding her voice, to demand to study music, art and other subjects with which she wishes to become independent, chafing under Don Lope, who thinks women are untrustworthy and should be kept at home. While sneaking out of the house against Lope's wishes, she meets Horacio, a young artist from Catalonia. The two fall in love and Horacio asks her to come live with him in Barcelona, but she remains apprehensive because of the Don's inescapable presence. Horacio confronts Don Lope outside his apartment, Lope slaps him and challenges him to a duel, and Hoarcio responds by simply punching him in the face. He and Tristana leave the following day.

Five years later, Tristana returns, having suddenly fallen ill. She demands to be remanded to Don Lope's house so she can die there. Tristana survives but loses a leg in the process, which changes her prospects. She breaks up with Horacio and seemingly reinstates the previous relationship with Don Lope, but is now much more independent and openly defiant. Don Lope, whose health problems have only worsened, suddenly inherits money from his sister, which Tristana covets. She agrees to have a marriage of convenience with Lope in order to, as a local priest describes, "correct a previously sinful situation," but makes it clear she has no desire for a romantic or sexual relationship, taking up the housemaid's deaf-mute son Saturno as a lover.

One night, Lope suffers a heart attack in bed. Tristana pretends to get help until he's fallen unconscious, and finishes him off by opening the window to the winter cold. The film ends with a montage of scenes playing back in reverse, ending at the moment Don Lope first seduced Tristana.

Cast

Production
Buñuel first began working on Tristana in 1962 after Spanish censors rejected his script Secuestro. Buñuel suggested adapting Benito Pérez Galdós's novel instead to his producers at Epoca and was paid $30,000 to write the screenplay. Buñuel and Julio Alejandro wrote the script in December 1962 and updated the novel's setting to the period between the late 1920s to early 1930s. Buñuel and Epoca submitted their script to the Spanish censors in the spring of 1963, hoping to begin shooting in the summer. At the last minute, the Ministry of Culture rejected the script because of its depiction of duelling and Buñuel made Diary of a Chambermaid instead.

In December 1968, Buñuel decided to return to Spain after being allowed back into the Catholic Church. When he returned, producers from Epoca approached him about reviving Tristana. Buñuel was initially uninterested and wanted to instead film his script for The Monk, which would have starred Jeanne Moreau, Peter O'Toole and Omar Sharif. But producers at Epoca managed to find funding from Italian and French investors and secure the newly built Siena Studios in Madrid, convincing Buñuel to agree to the project. Buñuel and Alejandro quickly finished their fourth draft of the screenplay.

Buñuel wanted Tristana to be his triumphant return to Spain after living in Mexico for several decades and worked hard on the film. Buñuel travelled to Spain in the spring of 1969 to begin work on the film, and was immediately sidetracked by the Spanish censors. Spain's Franco government made it difficult for the notorious and outspoken atheist Buñuel to get his films approved. However, Minister of Information Manuel Fraga Iribarne was known to be more liberal than past Ministers and told Buñuel that he would approve the script only if Buñuel promised to not change the script during the film's shooting. Buñuel refused, stating that the script was merely a blueprint. Eventually Buñuel got his and Fraga's mutual friend Rafael Mendez to act as a go-between and convince Fraga to approve the script.

Buñuel's French investors insisted that Catherine Deneuve be cast as Tristana and his Italian investors wanted young heartthrob Franco Nero to play Horacio. Filming began in September 1969. Actress Vanessa Redgrave was often on the film's set after recently divorcing Tony Richardson for Nero, which caused Nero to often be late or distracted during filming. The film's plot has many similarities to Buñuel's earlier film Viridiana and the character of Don Lope is partially based on Buñuel's father, who was also a "señorito (an adult who never worked a day in his life but lives comfortably, or even luxuriously, thanks to an inheritance).  Buñuel based much of Tristana's schoolgirl innocence on memories of his younger sister Conchita.

Differences from the novel
Buñuel was quite critical of Pérez Galdós' novel despite being a fan of the author, finding it kitschy, predictable, and among the author's worst works. Nonetheless, he believed that it would make an excellent film adaptation, though made some notable changes.

In the novel, Tristana resignedly marries don Lope in order for him to receive his inheritance. Also different from the novel is Saturno's increased role—barely mentioned in the novel, he is Tristana's third love interest in the film.

Release 
The film premiered in Madrid on March 18, 1970, and opened in theatres on March 29. It opened in France on April 28 after a screening at the Hyères Film Festival, and in Italy in June. In the United States, it screened at the New York Film Festival in September and had a limited release in New York City and Los Angeles later that year. It also screened out of the main competition at the 1970 Cannes Film Festival.

Reception
The film has a 97% "Fresh" positive review score on the film review aggregator Rotten Tomatoes.

Awards and nominations

See also
 List of submissions to the 43rd Academy Awards for Best Foreign Language Film
 List of Spanish submissions for the Academy Award for Best Foreign Language Film

References

External links
 
 
 

1970 films
1970 drama films
1970s French films
1970s Italian films
1970s Spanish films
1970s Spanish-language films
Films based on Spanish novels
Films based on works by Benito Pérez Galdós
Films directed by Luis Buñuel
Films produced by Robert Dorfmann
Films set in the 1920s
Films set in the 1930s
Films set in Toledo, Spain
Films shot in Madrid
Films shot in the province of Toledo
French drama films
Italian drama films
Spanish drama films
Spanish-language French films